Events from the year 1772 in France.

Incumbents 
Monarch: Louis XV

Events
 12 February – Breton-French explorer Yves-Joseph de Kerguelen-Trémarec discovers the uninhabited Kerguelen Islands in the Southern Ocean.
 The Clicquot Champagne house is founded by Philippe Clicquot in Reims.
 Houbigant Parfum is founded by Jean-François Houbigant of Grasse in Paris.

Births
 20 January – Angélique Brûlon, soldier, first female Knight of the Legion of Honour (d. 1859) 
 7 April – Charles Fourier, philosopher (d. 1837)
 25 October – Géraud Duroc, general (d. 1813)

Deaths
 21 March – Jacques-Nicolas Bellin, cartographer (b. 1703)
 26 March – Charles Pinot Duclos, writer (b. 1704)
 15 June – Louis-Claude Daquin, composer (b. 1694)
 22 June – François-Vincent Toussaint, writer most famous for Les Mœurs (b. 1715)
 8 October – Jean-Joseph de Mondonville, violinist and composer (b. 1711)

See also

References

1770s in France